The 2012–13 Saudi Professional League (known as the Zain Professional League for sponsorship reasons) was the 37th season of the Saudi Professional League, the top Saudi professional league for association football clubs, since its establishment in 1976. The season began on 2 August 2012 and ended on 27 April 2013. Al-Shabab were the defending champions. The league was contested by the 12 teams from the 2011–12 season as well as Al-Shoulla and Al-Wehda, who joined as the promoted clubs from the 2011–12 First Division. They replace Al-Ansar and Al-Qadisiyah who were relegated to the 2012–13 First Division.

On 14 April, Al-Fateh won their first League title, with 2 games to spare, following a 1–0 home win over Al-Ahli. Al-Fateh became the seventh club to win the Pro League. This is considered by many to be one of the greatest shocks in Saudi football history, especially considering that Al-Fateh were promoted to the Pro League for the first time only four years earlier.

Al-Wehda were the first team to be relegated following a 2–1 home defeat to Al-Faisaly on 29 March. Hajer became the second and final team to be relegated following a 2–1 defeat away to Al-Shabab on the final matchday.

Teams
Fourteen teams competed in the league – the twelve teams from the previous season and the two teams promoted from the First Division. The promoted teams were Al-Shoulla (returning after an absence of eight seasons) and Al-Wehda (returning after a season's absence). They replaced Al-Qadisiyah (ending their three-year top-flight spell) and Al-Ansar (who were relegated after one season in the top flight).

Stadiums and locations

Note: Table lists in alphabetical order.

Personnel and kits 

 1 On the back of the strip.
 2 On the right sleeve of the strip.

Managerial changes

Foreign players
The number of foreign players is restricted to four per team, including a slot for a player from AFC countries.

Players name in bold indicates the player is registered during the mid-season transfer window.

 Anas Sharbini has Jordanian citizenship and was counted as an Asian player.
 Ahmad Sharbini has Jordanian citizenship and was counted as an Asian player.

League table

Results

Season statistics

Scoring

Top scorers

Hat-tricks 

Notes
(H) – Home team(A) – Away team

Most assists

Clean sheets

Discipline

Player 
 Most yellow cards: 8
 Majed Ali (Najran)
 Abdelatif Bahdari (Hajer)
 Lassana Fané (Al-Shoulla)

 Most red cards: 1
22 players

Club 
 Most yellow cards: 60
 Hajer

 Most red cards: 4
 Al-Nassr

Attendances

By team

†

†

Awards
On 7 February 2014, it was announced that both Al-Riyadiya Awards and Arriyadiyah Awards for Sports Excellence would be merged and known as the Arriyadiyah Awards for Sports Excellence. The Arriyadiyah Awards for Sports Excellence were awarded for the seventh time since its inception in 2007. The awards were sponsored by Saudi newspaper Arriyadiyah and Saudi sports network Al-Riyadiya. The awards were presented on 16 February 2014.

References

Saudi Professional League seasons
Saudi Professional League
Professional League